Lukáš Csölley (born 18 June 1990) is a Slovak former competitive ice dancer. With Lucie Myslivečková, he competed at the 2018 Winter Olympics in Pyeongchang, South Korea. With Federica Testa, he won four ISU Challenger Series medals and bronze at the 2015 Winter Universiade. They finished in the top ten at the 2015 and 2016 European Championships.

Career

Early years 
Csölley started learning to skate in 1995. He competed in singles until the age of 16.

Partnership with Višňová 
In 2006, Csölley switched to ice dancing and teamed up with Nikola Višňová from the Czech Republic. They decided to represent Slovakia. In their first two seasons, they trained under Gabriela Hrázská in Brno, Bratislava, and Oberstdorf. They finished 19th at the 2007 World Junior Championships in Oberstdorf and 17th at the 2008 World Junior Championships in Sofia.

In the 2008–2009 season, Višňová/Csölley trained in Berlin, Oberstdorf, and Brno, coached by Hendryk Schamberger. They placed 17th at the 2009 World Junior Championships in Sofia.

During the next two seasons, the two were coached by Roberto Pelizzola and Raffaella Cazzaniga in Milan. They ranked 20th at the 2010 European Championships in Tallinn, Estonia; 19th at the 2010 World Junior Championships in The Hague, Netherlands; 22nd at the 2011 European Championships in Bern, Switzerland; and 5th at the 2011 World Junior Championships in Gangneung, South Korea.

In September 2011, Slovak news reported that their partnership had ended.

2011–2012 season: First season with Testa 

In October 2011, Slovak news media reported that Csölley had teamed up with Italy's Federica Testa to compete for Slovakia. Coached by Roberto Pelizzola in Milan, Testa/Csölley made their international debut at the Bavarian Open in February 2012 and then competed at the World Championships in March in Nice, France.

2012–2013 season 

Testa/Csölley finished 17th at the 2013 European Championships in Zagreb, Croatia, having placed 19th in the short dance and 16th in the free dance. At the 2013 World Championships in London, Ontario, Canada, the two placed 26th in the short dance and did not advance further.

2013–2014 season 

In September 2013, Testa/Csölley competed at the final Olympic qualifying event, the Nebelhorn Trophy; they finished ninth and became the first alternates for the 2014 Winter Olympics. In January 2014, they placed 12th at the European Championships in Budapest, Hungary but the two missed the cut-off for the free dance in March at the World Championships in Saitama, Japan.

2014–2015 season 

Paola Mezzadri joined Pelizzola as Testa/Csölley's coach. They began their season with a bronze medal at the 2014 Ondrej Nepela Trophy, an ISU Challenger Series (CS) event held in early October. Later that month, making their Grand Prix debut, they placed fourth in the short dance and seventh overall at the 2014 Skate America. In November, they were awarded gold at two CS competitions, the Volvo Open Cup and Warsaw Cup.

They finished eighth overall at the 2015 European Championships in Stockholm, Sweden. In March, they placed 15th at the 2015 World Championships in Shanghai, having ranked 13th in the short and 15th in the free.

2015–2016 season 

Testa/Csölley finished 9th in the short dance, 8th in the free dance, and 8th overall at the 2016 European Championships in Bratislava. At the 2016 World Championships in Boston, they placed 12th in the short, 15th in the free, and 14th overall.

2016–2017 season: First season with Myslivečková 

Testa/Csölley received invitations to the 2016 Skate Canada International and 2016 Trophée de France but withdrew from both Grand Prix events on 7 July 2016 due to Testa's decision to retire from competition.
After Testa's retirement, Csölley contacted Czech ice dancer Lucie Myslivečková on Skype. They teamed up in late June 2016 and announced on 11 July 2016 that they would compete together for Slovakia. During their first season together, they were coached by Roberto Pelizzola and Paola Mezzadri in Milan, Italy.

Myslivečková/Csölley won gold at the Volvo Open Cup in November 2016 and placed 16th at the 2017 European Championships in Ostrava, Czech Republic. In mid-March 2017, they decided to withdraw from the World Championships in Helsinki due to Myslivečková's shoulder injury, requiring an operation.

2017–2018 season: 2018 Winter Olympics 

During the season, Myslivečková/Csölley trained under Barbara Fusar-Poli, Stefano Caruso, and Roberto Pelizzolla in Milan, Italy. In late September, the duo competed at the 2017 CS Nebelhorn Trophy, the final qualifying opportunity for the 2018 Winter Olympics. Their result, 6th, was sufficient to obtain an Olympic spot for Slovakia, by 0.27 of a point. In January, they placed 17th at the 2018 European Championships in Moscow, Russia.

In February, the two competed at the 2018 Winter Olympics in Pyeongchang, South Korea. They qualified to the free dance and finished 20th overall. In March, they placed 25th at the 2018 World Championships in Milan, Italy.

Following Myslivečková's decision to retire, Csölley briefly trained with Testa. On June 28, 2018, he announced his retirement from competition.

Programs

With Myslivečková

With Testa

With Višňová

Competitive highlights 
GP: Grand Prix; CS: Challenger Series; JGP: Junior Grand Prix

With Myslivečková

With Testa

With Višňová

References

External links 

 
 
 
 Official website of Visnova / Csolley
 
 
 

1990 births
Figure skaters from Bratislava
Slovak male ice dancers
Universiade medalists in figure skating
Living people
Figure skaters at the 2018 Winter Olympics
Olympic figure skaters of Slovakia
Universiade bronze medalists for Slovakia
Competitors at the 2015 Winter Universiade
Competitors at the 2013 Winter Universiade